R. Leigh's XI was a scratch first-class cricket team formed by the businessman Richard Leigh, who promoted matches in the 1790s. Leigh was the father of the 1800s player Richard Leigh but it is not known if Leigh senior was ever a player himself. The team is known to have played in nine matches from 1793 to 1795, all of them against other scratch teams organised by rival patrons.

References

Further reading
  
 

Former senior cricket clubs
English cricket in the 18th century